|}

The Feilden Stakes is a Listed flat horse race in Great Britain open to three-year-old horses. It is run over a distance of 1 mile and 1 furlong (1,811 metres) on the Rowley Mile at Newmarket in mid-April.

History
The event was established in 1978, and it was originally called the Heath Stakes. The first running was won by Hawaiian Sound.

The race was renamed the Gerry Feilden Memorial Stakes in 1982. It was named in memory of Major General Sir Randle Feilden (1904–81), a former senior steward of the Jockey Club. Its title was shortened to the Feilden Stakes in 1987.

The event can serve as a trial for various Classic races. The runner-up in 1994, Erhaab, subsequently won The Derby, as did the 2015 winner, Golden Horn. The 2013 winner, Intello, went on to win the Prix du Jockey Club.

The Feilden Stakes is currently held on the final day of Newmarket's three-day Craven Meeting. It is run the day after the Craven Stakes.

Records

Leading jockey (4 wins):
 Greville Starkey – Ela-Mana-Mou (1979), Running Mill (1980), Kalaglow (1981), Zoffany (1983)
 Pat Eddery – Flying Trio (1986), Placerville (1993), Storm Trooper (1996), Olden Times (2001)
 Frankie Dettori - Border Arrow (1998), Dordogne (2011), Golden Horn (2015), Khalidi (2017)

Leading trainer (8 wins):
 Sir Henry Cecil – Ivano (1982), Trojan Fen (1984), Legal Bid (1987), Twist and Turn (1992), Placerville (1993), Cicerao (1994), Storm Trooper (1996), Stipulate (2012)

Winners

See also
 Horse racing in Great Britain
 List of British flat horse races
 Recurring sporting events established in 1978 – this race is included under its original title, Heath Stakes.

References

 Paris-Turf:
 Racing Post:

 pedigreequery.com – Feilden Stakes – Newmarket.

Flat horse races for three-year-olds
Newmarket Racecourse
Flat races in Great Britain
1978 establishments in England